Events from the year 1448 in England.

Incumbents
 Monarch – Henry VI
 Lord Chancellor – John Stafford
 Lord Privy Seal – Adam Moleyns

Events
 11 March – Hundred Years' War: England cedes Maine to France.
 16 March – Hundred Years' War: peace negotiations break down over the issue of English control over Brittany.
 23 October – Scottish victory over the English at the Battle of Sark.
 Queen Margaret of Anjou founds Queens' College, Cambridge.
 Earliest known reference to Morris dancing in England.
 The Sunday Fairs Act is passed.
 The Worshipful Company of Haberdashers receives its royal charter

Births
 John Talbot, 3rd Earl of Shrewsbury, nobleman (died 1473)
 Richard Pynson, printer (died 1529)

Deaths
 Thomas Dacre, knight (born 1410)
 William Aleyn, pirate (unknown)

 
Years of the 15th century in England